The APA Award for Distinguished Scientific Contributions to Psychology is an award of the American Psychological Association that "honors psychologists who have made distinguished theoretical or empirical contributions to basic research in psychology."

Recipients
Source: APA

20th Century 
	1956 Wolfgang Köhler, Carl R. Rogers, Kenneth W. Spence
	1957 Carl I. Hovland, Curt P. Richter, Edward C. Tolman
	1958 Frank A. Beach, Paul E. Meehl, B. F. Skinner
	1959 Leon Festinger, Donald B. Lindsley, Neal E. Miller
	1960 Harry F. Harlow, Charles E. Osgood, S. Smith Stevens
	1961 James J. Gibson, Donald O. Hebb, Henry A. Murray
	1962 Jerome S. Bruner, William K. Estes, Harry Helson
	1963 Roger G. Barker, George A. Miller, Carl Pfaffmann
	1964 Gordon W. Allport, Wendell R. Garner, J. P. Guilford
	1965 Floyd Allport, Fritz Heider, Paul Thomas Young
	1966 Nancy Bayley, Clarence H. Graham, Richard L. Solomon
	1967 Solomon E. Asch, Ernest R. Hilgard, James Olds
	1968 James E. Birren, Eleanor J. Gibson, Muzafer Sherif
	1969 Jean Piaget, Stanley Schachter, Herbert A. Simon
	1970 Donald T. Campbell, David Krech, R. Duncan Luce
	1971 Roger William Brown, Harold H. Kelley, Roger Wolcott Sperry
	1972 Edwin E. Ghiselli, Dorothea Jameson, Leo Hurvich, Patrick Suppes
	1973 Lee J. Cronbach, Brenda Milner, Benton J. Underwood
	1974 Angus Campbell, Lorrin A. Riggs, Richard F. Thompson
	1975 Donald E. Broadbent, Robert R. Sears, David Shakow
	1976 Beatrice C. Lacey,  John I. Lacey, Theodore Newcomb, Roger N. Shepard
	1977 Richard C. Atkinson, Russell L. De Valois, Edward E. Jones
	1978 Julian Hochberg, Philip Teitelbaum, Robert B. Zajonc
	1979 John W. Atkinson, Gordon H. Bower, John Garcia
	1980 Albert Bandura, Alvin M. Liberman, Michael I. Posner
	1981 David M. Green, Irving L. Janis, James L. McGaugh
	1982 Daniel Kahneman,  Amos Tversky, Walter Mischel, Mark R. Rosenzweig
	1983 John W. Thibaut, Endel Tulving, Hans Wallach
	1984 Noam Chomsky, John H. Flavell, Floyd Ratliff
	1985 Clyde Coombs, Mortimer Mishkin, Allen Newell
	1986 Robert P. Abelson, Gunnar Johansson, Robert A. Rescorla
	1987 Morton Deutsch, Jerome Kagan, David C. McClelland, Saul Sternberg, Niko Tinbergen, Ledyard R. Tucker
	1988 Irving T. Diamond, Frederic M. Lord, Eleanor E. Maccoby, William J. McGuire, Julian B. Rotter, George Sperling
	1989 Mary D. Salter Ainsworth,  John Bowlby, J. Douglas Carroll, Richard S. Lazarus
	1990 Frances K. Graham, John A. Swets, Anne Treisman
	1991 Paul Ekman, Patricia S. Goldman-Rakic, Richard E. Nisbett
	1992 Ursula Bellugi,  Edward S. Klima, Walter Kintsch, K. Warner Schaie
	1993 Peter J. Lang, Paul Slovic, Larry R. Squire
	1994 John R. Anderson, Jon Kaas, Neil Schneiderman
	1995 Rochel Gelman, William A. Mason, Michael L. Rutter
	1996 Robert W. Goy, James L. McClelland,  David E. Rumelhart, Shelley E. Taylor
	1997 Ellen S. Berscheid, Edward Smith, Robert H. Wurtz
	1998/1999 Elliot Aronson, William T. Greenough, Allan R. Wagner
	2000 Richard J. Davidson, E. Tory Higgins, Elizabeth S. Spelke

21st Century
2001 Alan D. Baddeley, Irving I. Gottesman, Michael M. Merzenich
2002 John T. Cacioppo, David E. Meyer, William T. Newsome
2003 Lila R. Gleitman, Bruce S. McEwen, Claude M. Steele
2004 Sheldon Cohen, E. Mavis Hetherington, Richard M. Shiffrin
2005 Charles G. Gross, Douglas L. Medin, Robert S. Siegler
2006 Michael Davis, Marcia K. Johnson, Martin E. P. Seligman
2007 Marilynn B. Brewer, Jean M. Mandler, Paul Rozin
2008 Michael S. Gazzaniga, Janellen Huttenlocher, Hazel Rose Markus
2009 Susan E. Carey, Alice H. Eagly, Steven F. Maier
2010 Jonathan D. Cohen, Susan T. Fiske, Joseph E. LeDoux
2011 Barry J. Everitt,  Trevor W. Robbins, Carol S. Dweck, Daniel M. Wegner
2012 Edward F. Diener, Michael Meaney, Daniel L. Schacter
2013 Ian H. Gotlib, Robert M. Sapolsky, Linda B. Smith
2014 Richard N. Aslin, John A. Bargh, Carol A. Barnes
2015 Stanislas Dehaene, Edna B. Foa, Michael Tomasello
2016 Dedre Gentner, Terrie E. Moffitt and Avshalom Caspi, Terry E. Robinson and Kent C. Berridge
2017 Mahzarin R. Banaji and Anthony G. Greenwald, Gordon D. Logan, Robert J. Plomin 
2018 Charles S. Carver, Michael F. Scheier, Janice K. Kiecolt-Glaser, Patricia K. Kuhl 
2019 Linda M. Bartoshuk, Dante Cicchetti, David A. Kenny
2020 Stephen P. Hinshaw, Elissa L. Newport, Lynn Nadel and John O’Keefe
2021 Lisa Feldman Barrett, Megan R. Gunnar, Henry L. Roediger
2022 BJ Casey, Susan A. Gelman, Shinobu Kitayama

See also

 List of psychology awards

References 

American psychology awards
American Psychological Association